Saganing Eagles Landing Casino is a casino located just outside the city of Standish, Michigan, United States. Opened on December 31, 2007, the casino is owned by the Saginaw Chippewa Tribal Council, which also owns the Soaring Eagle Casino in Mount Pleasant, Michigan. This is located on the tribe's Isabella Indian Reservation.

The casino features over 800 slot machines and virtual games on the gaming floor. Traditional table games such as blackjack and roulette are offered through a virtual experience.

The casino was renovated and expanded in 2019.

References

Casinos completed in 2007
Buildings and structures in Arenac County, Michigan
Casinos in Michigan
Native American casinos
Tourist attractions in Arenac County, Michigan
Native American history of Michigan